Duncan Forbes may refer to:
Duncan Forbes of Culloden (politician, died 1654), Scottish politician and burgh commissioner for Inverness
Duncan Forbes of Culloden (politician, born 1644) (1644–1704), Scottish politician and supporter of the House of Hanover, grandson of the above
Duncan Forbes of Culloden (judge, born 1685) (1685–1747), Scottish politician and judge, son of the above
Duncan Forbes (linguist) (1798–1868), Scottish linguist
Duncan Forbes (historian) (1922–1994), Scottish historian
Duncan Forbes (footballer) (1941–2019), Scottish footballer
Duncan Forbes (poet) (born 1947), British poet